IS may refer to:

Arts and media

Literature
 Book of Isaiah, a biblical text
 Is (novel), a novel by Joan Aiken
 i"s, a manga by Masakazu Katsura
 iS (manga), a manga by Chiyo Rokuhana
 Infinite Stratos, a Japanese light novel series

Other media
 is (album), a 1969 album by jazz pianist Chick Corea
 is, a 2012 album by Canadian pop band Hey Ocean!
 iS – internal section, a video game developed by Square

Businesses and organisations
 Islamic State, a militant group and self-proclaimed caliphate
 Intermediate school, education between primary and secondary schools areas, also known as middle school
 Ilta-Sanomat, a newspaper in Finland
 Independent Soldiers, a Canadian gang
 Intelligent Systems, a first-party video game developer and internal team of Nintendo
 International Socialists (disambiguation), several Trotskyist political organizations
 Investment—Saving, a curve in the IS/LM model of economics
 Island Airlines (IATA code)

Language
 Is, the third-person singular present tense of the English language verb "to be", frequently used as a copula
 Icelandic language (ISO 639-1 alpha-2 code)
 International Sign, a pidgin sign language

 Is (rune) (ᛁ), a rune of the Anglo-Saxon fuþorc

Places
 Island (Is.), any piece of land surrounded by water
 Iceland (ISO 3166-1 alpha-2 country code)
 Israel (NATO country code)
 Hīt, or Is, an Iraqi town on the Euphrates River
 Ys or Is, a mythical city of Brittany
 Iași County, Romania, (vehicle registration code)
 Inverness TMD, a railway traction maintenance depot (depot code)
 Province of Isernia, Italy (vehicle registration code)

Science and mathematics
 Immune system, organic mechanisms that protect against disease
 Immunosuppression
 Importance sampling, a statistical technique for estimating properties of a particular distribution
 Infrasound, sound frequencies below the human range of hearing
 Insertion sequence, a short DNA transposable element
 Intersex, an organism with sex characteristics neither exclusively male nor female

Technology

Computing
 .is, the Internet country-code top-level domain for Iceland
 Information science, the study of data collection, manipulation, and dissemination
 Information systems, organizations of data-processing persons, records, and activities
 InstallShield, a software tool for creating software installers for Microsoft Windows
 IntelliStar, a computer system used to display local forecasts on The Weather Channel

Vehicles and weaponry
 IS tank, a Soviet heavy tank in World War II.
 Istrebitel Sputnikov or "Destroyer of Satellites", a Soviet anti-satellite weapons program.
 Lexus IS, a sports car made by Lexus.
 Locomotive IS, a Soviet passenger steam locomotive.
 Nikitin-Shevchenko IS, a Soviet fighter aircraft.

Other uses in technology
 Image stabilization, a family of techniques to reduce blur caused by lens shakes
 Canon Image Stabilizer, a lens-based image stabilization technology by Canon
 Intrinsic safety, a protection technique for electronic equipment in explosive atmospheres
 Indian Standard, developed by the Bureau of Indian Standards, for example IS 456
 International Standard, a mounting standard for the calipers and rotors of disc-type bicycle brake systems

Other uses
 Implementation shortfall, difference between decision price and implementation price in finance
 Internal security, the work of keeping domestic peace by a national force
 International studies, or International relations, the study of politics, economics and law on a global level
 Is, in is-ought philosophy, a fact or empirical state with finite limits in space and time
 Old Israeli Shekel, commonly denominated as IS

See also
 I (disambiguation)
 Independence Square (disambiguation), several public squares around the world
 International System of Units (SI), the modern form of the metric system
 Interstate (disambiguation)
 Islamic state, a form of government based on Islamic law